The King's Daughter is a 1974 historical novel.

The King's Daughter(s) may also refer to:
The King's Daughters, a 2000 French film
The King's Daughter (1916 film), a British film
The King's Daughter (2022 film), an American film

See also
Daughters of the King, a religious order
The King's Daughter, Soo Baek-hyang, a Korean TV series
Geirlug The King's Daughter, an Icelandic fairy tale
The Marsh King's Daughter, an upcoming psychological thriller film
The Spider King's Daughter, a 2012 novel
The Monkey King's Daughter, a young readers book series